Sushkin is a Russian masculine surname, its feminine counterpart is Sushkina. Notable people with the surname include:

Petr Sushkin (1868–1928), Russian ornithologist
Vyacheslav Sushkin (born 1991), Russian footballer

Russian-language surnames